Ahmedabad East Lok Sabha constituency is one of the 26 Lok Sabha (lower house of Indian parliament) constituencies in Gujarat, a state in western India. This constituency was created as a part of the implementation of delimitation of parliamentary constituencies in 2008. It first held elections in 2009 and its first member of parliament (MP) was Harin Pathak of the Bharatiya Janata Party (BJP). The second elections which were held in 2014, film actor Paresh Rawal of the BJP represented this constituency. As of the 2019 elections, Hamukh Patel of the BJP represents this constituency.

Assembly segments
As of 2014, Ahmedabad East Lok Sabha constituency comprises seven Vidhan Sabha (legislative assembly) segments. These are:

Five of its seven Vidhan Sabha segments: Gandhinagar South, Vatva, Nikol, Thakkarbapa Nagar, and Bapunagar were also created in 2008 as a part of the implementation of delimitation of legislative assembly constituencies. Naroda and Dehgam were earlier in former Ahmedabad and Kapadvanj constituencies respectively.

Members of Parliament
 Elections until 2008, See Ahmedabad parliamentary constituency.
 This seat came into existence from 2009 elections.

Election results

General election 2019

General election 2014

General election 2009

See also
 Ahmedabad Lok Sabha constituency
 Ahmedabad District
 List of Constituencies of the Lok Sabha

References

Lok Sabha constituencies in Gujarat
Ahmedabad district
Government of Ahmedabad
Constituencies established in 2008